= Dana Campbell Vineyards =

Vineyard in the U.S. state of Oregon

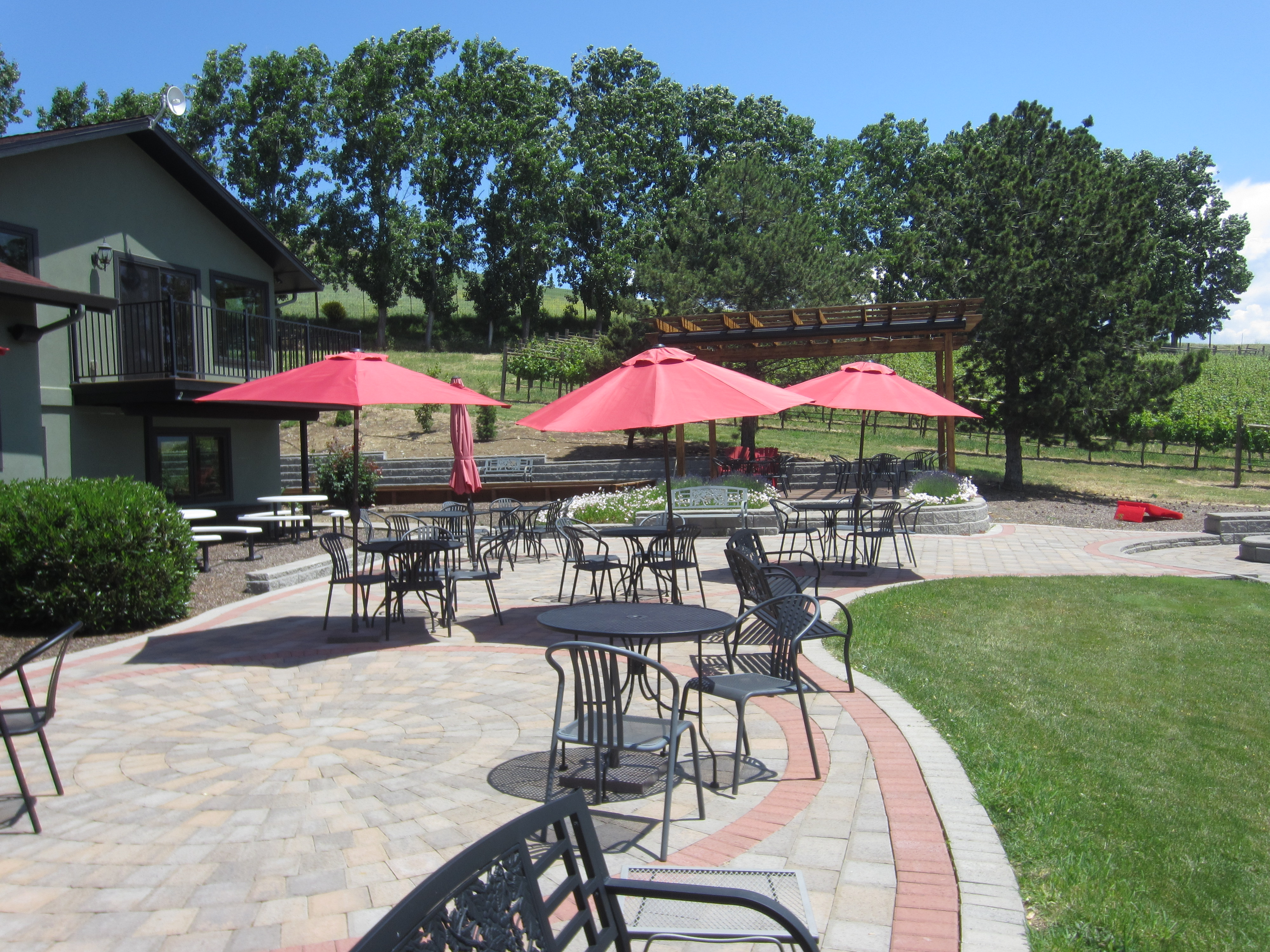
- Outdoor seating, 2019
- Location: Ashland, Oregon, United States
- Coordinates: 42°13′3″N 122°41′45″W

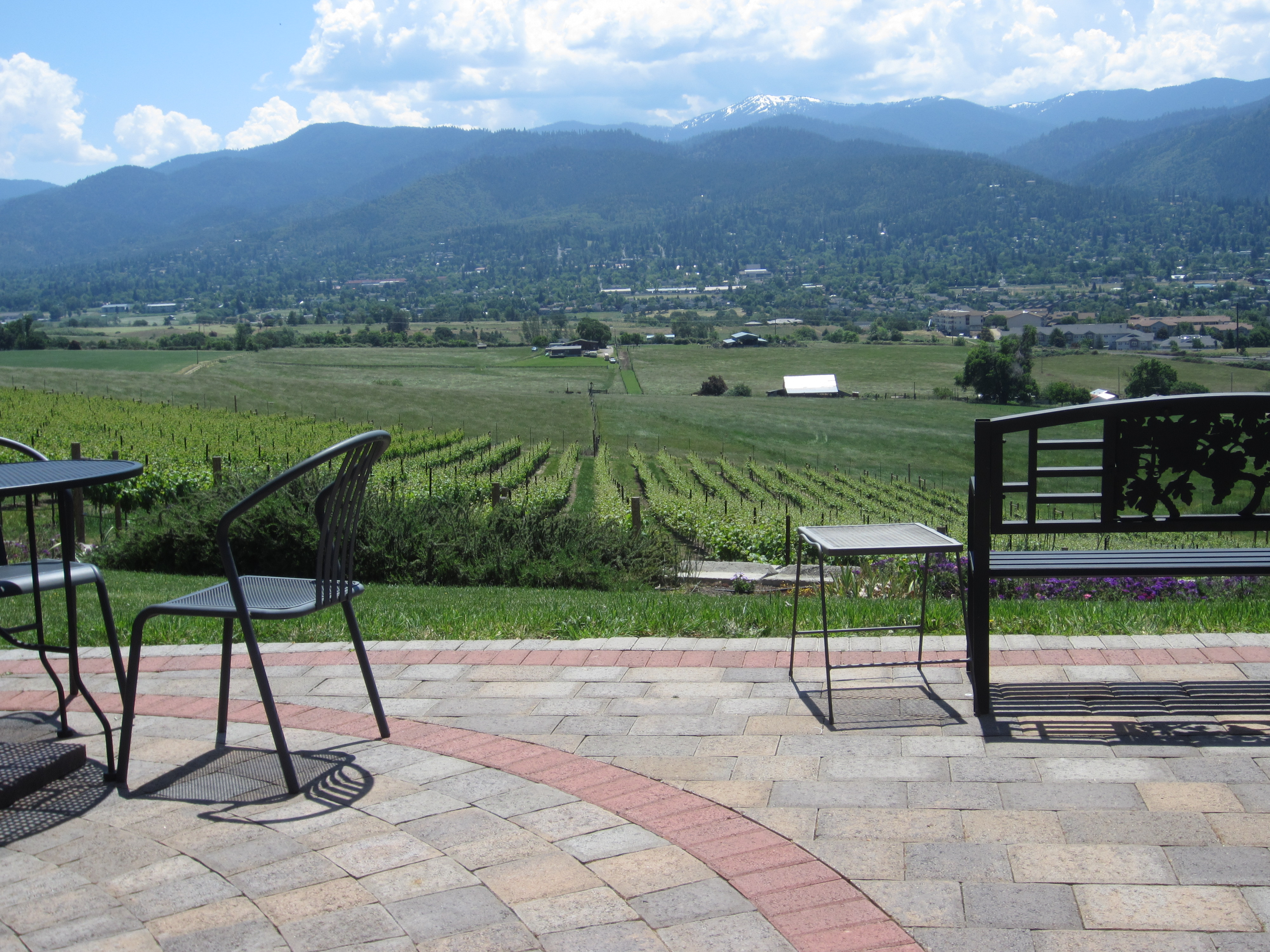
View of surrounding landscape

Dana Campbell Vineyards is a vineyard near Ashland, Oregon. Owners Patrick Dana Flannery and Paula Campbell Brown purchased the 33-acre (13 ha) property in 1997.
